Macrocystis pyrifera, commonly known as giant kelp or bladder kelp, is a species of kelp (large brown algae), and one of four species in the genus Macrocystis. Despite its appearance, it is not a plant; it is a heterokont. Giant kelp is common along the coast of the northeastern Pacific Ocean, from Baja California north to southeast Alaska, and is also found in the southern oceans near South America, South Africa, Australia, and New Zealand. Giant kelp grows in dense stands known as kelp forests, which are home to many marine animals that depend on the algae for food or shelter. The primary commercial product obtained from giant kelp is alginate, but humans also harvest this species on a limited basis for use directly as food, as it is rich in iodine, potassium, and other minerals. It can be used in cooking in many of the ways other sea vegetables are used, and particularly serves to add flavor to bean dishes.

Description
Macrocystis pyrifera is the largest of all algae. The stage of the life cycle that is usually seen is the sporophyte, which is perennial and individuals persist for many years. The kelp often grows even longer than the distance from the bottom to the surface as it will grow in a diagonal direction due to the ocean current pushing against the kelp. The stalks arise from a basal meristem, with as many as 60 stalks in older well protected plants. Blades develop at irregular intervals along the stipe, with a single pneumatocyst (gas bladder) at the base of each blade. At the base of each stalk a cluster of blades that lack pneumatocysts, instead they develop small sacks on the blade that release the biflagellated zoospores these are the sporophylls.

It is found on intertidal rocks or shallow subtidal rocks along the Pacific coast of North America (British Columbia to California) and South America. In New Zealand M. pyrifera is found in the subtidal zone of southern North Island, the South Island, Chatham, Stewart, Bounty, Antipodes, Auckland and Campbell Islands. The species can be found on rock and on sheltered open coasts.

Growth

Macrocystis pyrifera is one of the fastest-growing organisms on Earth.

Juvenile giant kelp grow directly upon their parent female gametophyte. To establish itself, a young kelp produces one or two primary blades, and begins a rudimentary holdfast, which serves to anchor the plant to the rocky bottom. As the kelp grows, additional blades develop from the growing tip, while the holdfast enlarges and may entirely cover the rock to which it is attached.

Growth occurs with lengthening of the stipe (central stalk), and splitting of the blades. At the growing tip is a single blade, at the base of which develop small gas bladders along one side. As the bladders and stipe grow, small tears develop in the attached blade. Once the tears have completed, each bladder supports a single separate blade along the stipe, with the bladders and their blades attached at irregular intervals.

Ecology
Macrocystis pyrifera is found in North America (Alaska to California), South America, South Africa, New Zealand, and southern Australia. It thrives in cooler waters where the ocean water temperature remains mostly below . The species is also found near Tristan da Cunha in the Mid-South Atlantic Ocean.

Where the bottom is rocky and affords places for it to anchor, giant kelp forms extensive kelp beds with large "floating canopies". When present in large numbers, giant kelp forms kelp forests that are home to many marine species that depend upon the kelp directly for food and shelter, or indirectly as a hunting ground for prey. Both the large size of the kelp and the large number of individuals significantly alter the availability of light, the flow of ocean currents, and the chemistry of the ocean water in the area where they grow.

In high-density populations, giant kelp individuals compete with other individuals of the species for space and resources. Giant kelp may also compete with Pterygophora californica in these circumstances.

Where surface waters are poor in nutrients, nitrogen in the form of amino acids is translocated up the stipe through sieve elements that very much resemble the phloem of vascular plants. Most translocation occurs to move carbon-rich photosynthate, and typically transfers material from mature regions to actively growing regions where the machinery of photosynthesis is not yet fully in place. Translocation also moves nutrients downward from light-exposed surface fronds to sporophylls (reproductive fronds) at the base of the kelp, where there is little light and thus little photosynthesis to produce food.

Aquaculture

Macrocystis pyrifera has been utilized for many years as a food source; it also contains many compounds such as iodine, potassium, other minerals vitamins and carbohydrates and thus has also been used as a dietary supplement. In the beginning of the 20th century California kelp beds were harvested as a source for soda ash. With commercial interest increasing significantly during the 1970s and the 1980s this was primarily due to the production of alginates, and also for biomass production for animal feed due to the energy crisis during that period. However the commercial production of M. pyrifera never became reality. With the end of the energy crisis and the decline in prices of alginates, the research into farming Macrocystis also declined.

The demand for M. pyrifera is increasing due to the newfound uses of these plants such as fertilizers, cultivation for bioremediation purposes, abalone and sea urchin feed. There is current research going into utilizing M. pyrifera as feed for other aquaculture species such as shrimps. Recently, M. pyrifera has been examined as a possible feedstock for conversion into ethanol for biofuel use.

Conservation
In recent years, the kelp forests have decreased dramatically throughout Japan, Chile, Korea, Australia and North America. Harvesting of kelp as a food source and other uses may be the least concerning aspect to its depletion. In the Northwest Pacific kelp forests in waters near large population centres may be most affected by the sewer/stormwater discharge.

The natural phenomenon known as El Niño cycles warm, tropical water from the South Pacific to Northern waters. This has been known to kill off M. pyrifera, due to its need for cold waters it would usually find in the North Pacific Ocean. In California, El Niño also brought along a population bloom of purple sea urchins which feed on the giant kelp. By the late 2000s most of the onshore giant kelp in California was practically nonexistent.

Tasmania
Off the coast of Tasmania, kelp forests have been significantly affected by several factors, including warming waters, shifting of the East Australian current (EAC), and invasion of long-spine sea urchins. Locals have noticed significant effects on the population of abalone, a food source for the Aboriginal Tasmanians for thousands of years. These changes have also affected the oyster farming industry.  By saving oysters that have survived disease outbreaks, they have been able to continue their way of life. It was estimated that by 2019, 95 per cent of the giant kelp forests along Tasmania's east coast had been lost within just a few decades. Some of this loss was attributed by locals to the harvesting of the forests by Alginates Australia, which opened its factory near Triabunna in 1963, shutting down operations 10 years later as uneconomical. However, expert in marine ecosystems Craig Johnson says that the loss of the forests "is almost certainly the result of climate change". Water temperatures along the east coast of Tasmania have been rising at nearly four times the average rate globally. The EAC brings warmer waters, which are also nutrient-poor compared to the previously usual cold water around the coast. Common kelp (Ecklonia radiata) is better at nitrogen storage than giant kelp, so has been taking over the areas formerly occupied by giant kelp.

Macrocystis pyrifera has become Australia’s first federally-listed endangered marine community. Scientists and conservationists are continuously looking into ways to restore the once heavily populated species to its original state. Methods include artificial reefs, reducing numbers of purple sea urchins in overpopulated areas, and planting roots along the ocean floor. Scientists had built 28 artificial reefs off Maria Island by 2019, and were hopeful of bringing the kelp forests back.

Gallery

Notes

References

Abbott, I A & G J Hollenberg. (1976) Marine Algae of California. California: Stanford University Press. 
Abbott, I. A. (1996). Ethnobotany of seaweeds: clues to uses of seaweeds. Hydrobiologia, 326-327(1), 15-20.
Agardh, C A. (1820) Species algarum rite cognitae, cum synonymis, differentiis specificis et descriptionibus succinctis. Vol. 1, Part 1, pp. [i-iv], [1]-168. Lund: Berling.
Buschmann, A., Varela, D., Hernández-González, M., & Huovinen, P. (2008). Opportunities and challenges for the development of an integrated seaweed-based aquaculture activity in Chile: determining the physiological capabilities of Macrocystis and Gracilaria as biofilters. Journal of Applied Phycology, 20(5), 571-577.
Buschmann, A. H., Hernández-González, M. C., Astudillo, C., Fuente, L. d. l., Gutierrez, A., & Aroca, G. (2005). Seaweed cultivation, product development and integrated aquaculture studies in Chile. World Aquaculture, 36(3), 51-53.
Bushing, William W (2000) Giant Bladder Kelp .
Druehl LD, Baird R, Lindwall A, Lloyd KE, Pakula S (1988) Longline cultivation of some Laminareaceae in British Columbia. Aquacult. Fish Management 19, 253–263.
Chaoyuan, W., & Guangheng, L. (1987). Progress in the genetics and breeding of economic seaweeds in China. Hydrobiologia, 151-152(1), 57-61.
Connor, Judith & Charles Baxter. (1989) Kelp Forests. Monterey, California: Monterey Bay Aquarium. 
Cribb, A B. (1953) Macrocystis pyrifera (L.) Ag. in Tasmanian waters Australian Journal of Marine and Freshwater Research 5 (1):1-34.
Cruz-Suarez, L. Elizabeth; Tapia-Salazar, M., Nieto López, M., Guajardo-Barbosa, C., & Ricque-Marie, D. (2009). Comparison of Ulva clathrata and the kelps Macrocystis pyrifera and Ascophyllum nodosum as ingredients in shrimp feeds. Aquaculture Nutrition, 15(4), 421-430.
Davis, Chuck. (1991) California Reefs. San Francisco, California: Chronicle Books. 
Fishery and Aquaculture Statistics (2007). retrieved from ftp.fao.org
Gutierrez, A., Correa, T., Muñoz, V., Santibañez, A., Marcos, R., Cáceres, C., et al. (2006). Farming of the Giant Kelp Macrocystis Pyrifera in Southern Chile for Development of Novel Food Products. Journal of Applied Phycology, 18(3), 259-267.
Hoek, C van den; D G Mann & H M Jahns. (1995) Algae: An Introduction to Phycology. Cambridge: Cambridge University Press. 
Huisman, J M (2000) Marine Plants of Australia. University of Western Australia Press. 
Kain, J M (1991) Cultivation of attached seaweeds in Guiry, M D & G Blunden (1991) Seaweed Resources in Europe: Uses and Potential. John Wiley and Sons.
Lobban, C S & P J Harrison. (1994) Seaweed Ecology and Physiology. Cambridge: Cambridge University Press. 
Macchiavello, J., Araya, E., & Bulboa, C. Production of Macrocystis pyrifera (Laminariales;Phaeophyceae) in northern Chile on spore-based culture. Journal of Applied Phycology, 1-7.
Mariculture of Seaweeds. (2010). Retrieved from https://web.archive.org/web/20101226110745/http://aquanic.org/species/documents/6_Algae_3__Culturing.pdf
Mondragon, Jennifer & Jeff Mondragon. (2003) Seaweeds of the Pacific Coast. Monterey, California: Sea Challengers. 
Neushul M (1987) Energy from marine biomass: The historicalrecord. In: Bird KT, Benson PH (eds), Seaweed Cultivation for Renewable Resources, Elsevier Science Publishers, Amsterdam, 1–37.
North, W J, G A Jackson, & S L Manley. (1986) "Macrocystis and its environment, knowns and unknowns." Aquatic Biology 26:9-26.
Prescott, G W. (1968) The Algae: A Review. Boston: Houghton Mifflin Company.
Reed, D C. (1990) "The effects of variable settlement and early competition on patterns of kelp recruitment." Ecology 71:776-787.
Reed, D C, M Neushul, & A W Ebeling. (1991) "Role of settlement density on gametophyte growth and reproduction in the kelps Pterygophora californica and Macrocystis pyrifera (Phaeophyceae)." Journal of Phycology 27:361-366.
Simenstad, C.A., Estes, J.A. and Kenyon, K.W., 1978. Aleuts, sea otters, and alternatestable state communities. Science, 200: 403-411.
Wargacki, A.J., Leonard, E., Win, M.N., Regitsky, D.D., Santos, C.N.S., et al. (2012). An engineered microbial platform for direct biofuel production from brown macroalgae. Science, 335(1), 308-313.
Westermeier, R., Patiño, D., Piel, M. I., Maier, I., & Mueller, D. G. (2006). A new approach to kelp mariculture in Chile: production of free-floating sporophyte seedlings from gametophyte cultures of Lessonia trabeculata and Macrocystis pyrifera. Aquaculture Research, 37(2), 164-171.
Westermeier, R., Patiño, D., & Müller, D. G. (2007). Sexual compatibility and hybrid formation between the giant kelp species Macrocystis pyrifera and M. integrifoliat (Laminariales, Phaeophyceae) in Chile. Journal of Applied Phycology, 19(3), 215-221.
 White, L P & L G Plaskett, (1982) Biomass as Fuel. Academic Press.

Further reading
 Connor, Judith & Charles Baxter. (1989) Kelp Forests. Monterey, California: Monterey Bay Aquarium. 
 Davis, Chuck. (1991) California Reefs. San Francisco, California: Chronicle Books.

External links

Laminariaceae
Flora of the Pacific
Marine biota of North America
Flora of California
Flora of Northwestern Mexico
Flora of Southwestern Mexico
Flora of the West Coast of the United States
Species described in 1820
Flora of Tasmania
Flora of Victoria (Australia)
Flora of South Australia
Flora without expected TNC conservation status